Howard Thomas Markey (November 10, 1920 – May 3, 2006) was an American jurist who served as the first Chief United States circuit judge of the United States Court of Appeals for the Federal Circuit. He is often credited with establishing that court's renown and competence in intellectual property law.

Early life, military and legal career

Markey was born in Chicago, Illinois to Thomas Joseph and Vera Marie (Dryden) Markey. He served in the United States Army Air Forces during World War II as a test pilot, flying P-38s and P-59 jets in extreme cold-weather. He left the army in 1946 as a major, and became a lieutenant colonel in the United States Air Force Reserve. Markey subsequently earned his undergraduate degree and a Bachelor of Laws in an accelerated one-year program at Loyola University Chicago School of Law in 1949, and a Master of Laws in patent law in 1950 from John Marshall Law School in Chicago. He returned to active military service in the Korean War, in which he served as a planner of the Korean Airlift.

Markey returned to Chicago following the war, specializing his private legal practice in patent law and other areas of intellectual property. He remained in the Air Force Reserve, then transferred to the Air National Guard, serving as commander of the Illinois Air National Guard, then returning to the Air Force Reserve as deputy commander of the Air Force Reserve's portion of Tactical Air Command. Markey retired from the Air Force Reserve in 1976 as a major general, having received the Distinguished Service Medal, the Legion of Merit and the Distinguished Flying Cross. He was a lecturer at Loyola University Chicago School of Law from 1971 to 1972.

Federal judicial service

Markey was nominated by President Richard Nixon on May 3, 1972, to the designated Chief Judge seat on the United States Court of Customs and Patent Appeals vacated by Chief Judge Eugene Worley. He was confirmed by the United States Senate on June 21, 1972, and received his commission on June 22, 1972. He was reassigned by operation of law on October 1, 1982, to the United States Court of Appeals for the Federal Circuit, to a new seat authorized by 96 Stat. 25. He served as the court's first Chief Judge from 1982 to 1990. His service terminated on April 30, 1991, due to his retirement.

During his tenure on both courts, and while sitting by designation in the regional circuits, Markey is estimated to have participated in more than 6,400 cases, and to have written over 1,000 opinions. Following his retirement from the bench, Markey served as the dean of John Marshall Law School in Chicago, Illinois, from 1991 until 1994.

In 1997, the United States Congress renamed the Federal Circuit's Washington, D.C. headquarters the Howard T. Markey National Courts Building. Congressman Henry Hyde (R-IL), then-Chairman of the House Judiciary Committee, said that Markey's efforts had established the Federal Circuit as "the world's most respected and followed court on matters of intellectual property."

Retirement and death

Markey, who suffered from Parkinson's disease, died on May 3, 2006, in a nursing home in Hinsdale, Illinois where he lived his last years. Known for his sense of humor, he is said to have asked the nursing home staff to call him "judge" and "general" on alternate days. Markey was buried at Arlington National Cemetery. His wife of 52 years, Elizabeth Pelletier Markey, died in 1994. They had three sons.

References

Sources
 
Obituaries: Howard Markey; First Chief Judge of Federal Circuit Appellate Court, Patricia Sullivan.  Washington Post, May 5, 2006.
Former Federal Circuit Judge Howard T. Markey Dies, BNA Patent, Trademark & Copyright Journal, May 5, 2006.

1920 births
2006 deaths
20th-century American judges
United States Army Air Forces pilots of World War II
United States Air Force personnel of the Korean War
American test pilots
Burials at Arlington National Cemetery
Neurological disease deaths in Illinois
Deaths from Parkinson's disease
Judges of the United States Court of Appeals for the Federal Circuit
Judges of the United States Court of Customs and Patent Appeals
Deans of law schools in the United States
Lawyers from Chicago
Loyola University Chicago School of Law alumni
Recipients of the Distinguished Flying Cross (United States)
Recipients of the Distinguished Service Cross (United States)
Recipients of the Legion of Merit
United States Air Force generals
United States Army Air Forces officers
United States Article I federal judges appointed by Richard Nixon
John Marshall Law School (Chicago) alumni